Ibarra Peak is the summit at the extremity of the ridge which extends eastwards from the Royal Society Range between Mitchell Glacier and Lister Glacier, in Victoria Land, Antarctica. It was named in 1992 by the Advisory Committee on Antarctic Names after Phillip D. Ibarra, a United States Geological Survey (USGS) cartographic technician who was a member of USGS field parties in the 1988–89, 1989–90 and 1990–91 seasons.

References

Royal Society Range
Mountains of Victoria Land
Scott Coast